Piperidylthiambutene (Piperidinohton) is a synthetic opioid analgesic drug from the thiambutene family, which has around the same potency as morphine. Piperidylthiambutene is structurally distinct from fentanyl, its analogues, and other synthetic opioids previously reported. If sold or obtained for the purpose of human consumption it could be considered a controlled substance analogue in some countries such as the US, Australia and New Zealand. Piperidylthiambutene has been sold as a designer drug, first appearing in late 2018.

Synthesis

The Grignard reaction between 3-Piperidinobutyric acid ethyl ester, CID:10774378 (1) and 2-Bromothiophene [1003-09-4] (2) gives 3. Dehydration in acid completes the synthesis.

References 

Opioids
Thiophenes
1-Piperidinyl compounds
Mu-opioid receptor agonists